The Lady Ruggers are Penn State University's1(PSU) Women's Rugby Football Club sports team, established in 1991. They are a Division I college rugby team who play under USA Rugby2, American rugby's governing body. Although they are an official PSU team the women's rugby program at PSU is not funded as a varsity sport and therefore can not be officially called the "Nittany Lions". They however play other school's varsity teams and get more assistance from the school as a sports program than Penn State's many club sports. Formally coached by Peter Steinberg.

The Alumni Association which supports the team also works with the Penn State's Men's Rugby Team.

Division I National Final Four Appearances (15s)
 1993 – 3rd Place
 1994 – 3rd Place
 1995 – 2nd Place (Princeton def. Penn State)
 1996 – 2nd Place (Princeton def. Penn State)
 1997 – National Champions (Runner-up Radcliffe)
 1998 – 2nd Place (Radcliffe def. Penn State)
 2000 – National Champions (Runner-up Princeton)
 2001 – 2nd Place (Chico State def. Penn State)
 2002 – 2nd Place (Air Force def. Penn State)
 2003 – 3rd Place
 2004 – National Champions (Runner-up Princeton)
 2005 – 2nd Place (Stanford 53 Penn State 6)
 2006 – 2nd Place (Stanford 15 Penn State 12)
 2007 – National Champions (Penn State 22 Stanford 21)
 2008 – 2nd Place (Stanford 15 Penn State 10)
 2009 – National Champions (Penn State 46 Stanford 7)
 2010 – National Champions (Penn State 24 Stanford 7)
 2011 – 2nd Place (Army 33 Penn State 29)
 2012 – National Champions (Penn State 46 Stanford 15)
 2013 – National Champions (Penn State 65 Norwich 10)
 2014 – National Champions (Penn State 38 Stanford 0)
 2015 – National Champions (Penn State 61 Central Washington 7)
 2016 – National Champions (Penn State 15 Brigham Young 5)
 2017 – National Champions (Penn State 28 Lindenwood 25)
 2018 – lost semifinal game
 2019 – lost semifinal game
 2020 – cancelled (pandemic)
 2021 – did not compete (pandemic)

National championship winners

Rugby Sevens Collegiate Championships
Collegiate Rugby Championship

2011- 2nd Place (Penn State 5 Army 14)

USA Rugby Sevens Collegiate National Championships

In the first three years, the tournament was held in December, and the location necessitated considerable travel costs. Because of the impact on their programs, strong teams that won bids declined to participate.

Captains 
Captains are selected by team members. To qualify to vote a player must have played with the team for at least one semester at the time of the vote. Coaching staff have no vote. A captain's term last one semester, but can be reelected an unlimited number of times.
 Fall 2001 - Claudia Braymer '02, Scrumhalf
 Spring 2002 - Claudia Braymer '02, Scrumhalf
 Spring 2004 - Kim Magrini '04, Scrumhalf
 Fall 2004 - Maggie Reed '05, 2nd Row, 8, & Flanker
 Spring 2005 - Maggie Reed '05, 2nd Row, 8, & Flanker
 Fall 2005 - Amber Benlian '06, Center
 Spring 2006 - Amber Benlian '06, Center
 Fall 2006 - Diana Klein '07, Fullback
 Spring 2007 - Alison Searle '07, Lock
 Fall 2007 - Lauren Rosso '09, Outside Center
 Spring 2008 - Kristen Snyder '09, Hooker
 Fall 2008 - Annie Zeigler '10, Scrumhalf
 Spring 2009 - Kristen Snyder '09, Hooker
 Fall 2009 - Ann Blair '09, Wing
 Spring 2010 - R. Smyers '10, Lock
 Fall 2010 - Sadie Anderson '12, Flyhalf
 Spring 2011 - Kyle Armstrong '12, Lock
 Fall 2011 - Sadie Anderson '12, Flyhalf
 Spring 2021 - Ellie Fromstein and Mia Lancellotti

See also

References

External links
 Team's Website
 USA Rugby
 National College Rankings
 Article about the team
 Article about the team
 Penn State University
 Team's Alumni Website

Rugby union teams in Pennsylvania
Women's rugby union teams in the United States
Women's sports in Pennsylvania
Pennsylvania State University